1800 series may refer to the following:

 Keihan 1800 series electric multiple unit train type operated by Keihan Electric Railway
 Keio 1800 series electric multiple unit train type operated by Keio Corporation
 Meitetsu 1800 series electric multiple unit train type
 Tobu 1800 series electric multiple unit train type
 Toyohashi 1800 series electric multiple unit train type operated by Toyohashi Railroad